Ulrike is a German feminine given name. It may also refer to:

 Ulrike (genus), a genus of snakefly
 885 Ulrike, a minor planet orbiting the Sun